Bochanka is a rural locality (a khutor) in Volokonovsky District, Belgorod Oblast, Russia. The population was 79 as of 2010. There is 1 street.

Geography 
Bochanka is located 34 km southwest of Volokonovka (the district's administrative centre) by road. Volchy-Pervy is the nearest rural locality.

References 

Rural localities in Volokonovsky District